Love's Travel Stops & Country Stores, doing business as Love's (or stylized as Loves), is an American family-owned chain of more than 600 truck stop and convenience stores in 42 states in the United States. The company is privately owned and headquartered in Oklahoma City, Oklahoma. Love's ranked No. 17 on the 2019 Forbes list of America's largest private companies. Love's has two primary kinds of stores: country stores and travel stops. Country stores are fueling stations with a convenience store attached. The larger travel stops are located along highways and offer additional amenities such as food from restaurant chains such as Arby's, Baskin-Robbins, Bojangles, Burger King, Chester's, Dairy Queen, Del Taco, Dunkin', Friendly's, Godfather's Pizza, Green Burrito, McDonald's, Taco John's, Subway, Taco Bell, Wendy's, Hardee’s/Carls Jr., trucking supplies, showers and RV dump stations. Love's had 25,000 employees in 2018.

History
.

In 1964, Tom and Judy Love spent $5000 to lease an abandoned service station in Watonga, Oklahoma, an hour northwest of Oklahoma City. They named their company Musket Corporation. Over the next eight years, Musket opened 40 additional gas stations. All of them operated under the Kerr-McGee gasoline brand.

When the fuel crunch of the early 1970s began and gasoline was in short supply in the United States, Tom Love diversified for the sake of the company's success. He launched a new concept in Watonga: the "Mini Stop Country Store". The Mini Stop was successful and the company quickly opened more stores in western Oklahoma.

In 1972, Musket set out to convert all of its locations from gas stations to convenience stores with self-serve gasoline. By 1973, the company began using the family name to identify its locations. Love's Country Stores was the new name.

By 1978, Love's Country Stores had 60 locations in small communities throughout Oklahoma, Kansas, Colorado, New Mexico, and Texas. That year, the company began offering the Fresh Daily Deli, sandwiches made fresh daily on-location. Food service became the company's third profit center in each location, along with self-serve gasoline and convenience store items. The Fresh Daily Deli is branded today as Love's Subs.

By the end of 1981, the company reached a milestone with 100 Love's Country Stores locations in operation. The in-store decor was changed from the previous dark country look to a brighter theme. The same year, it opened the first Love's Travel Stop on Interstate 40 in Amarillo, Texas. The travel stop opened a new target audience to Love's business; the addition of self-serve diesel fuel brought professional drivers to Love's. The Travel Stop was unique in that it served both the professional driver and the motoring public, resulting in more growth for Love's.

In 1985, Love's added gifts and novelties. Then in 1993, Taco Bell became a partner, opening a co-branded location in Oklahoma City. The success of this partnership quickly grew.

In 1995, the company opened its first triple-branded food service operation in El Paso, Texas. The location offered Subway, Taco Bell Express and Pizza Hut.

In the late 1990s, food service continued to grow. Soon the company was partnering with an array of co-branded restaurant concepts, including Arby's, Baskin Robbins, Bojangles', Burger King, Carl's Jr., Chester's,  Dairy Queen, Del Taco, Denny's, Dunkin' Donuts, Godfather's Pizza, Green Burrito, Hardee's, IHOP Express, McDonald's, Sonic, Subway, Taco Bell, Taco John's and Wendy's.

In 2000, Sales & Marketing Executives International awarded Love's the 2000 Outlook Award, for innovation and outstanding contribution to the future of the convenience store industry.

The first truck tire care location opened in 2008, and since then, the business has grown into a nationwide network of centers, offering tires, equipment, light mechanical work, oil changes and roadside service.

On June 30, 2010, Love's acquired 20 Pilot Travel Centers locations and six Flying J locations out of antitrust concerns in order for the Federal Trade Commission to approve the Pilot/Flying J merger.

In June 2017, Love's opened its first location in Montana, its 41st state of operation. At the time, Love's operated more than 430 stores.

Love's Travel Stops & Country Stores entered into an partnership agreement with the National Basketball Association (NBA)'s Oklahoma City Thunder on March 15, 2019. The agreement allows Love's to prominently place its logo on the front left shoulder of all Oklahoma City Thunder jerseys. They also have had a long-standing sponsorship deal with NASCAR Cup Series team Front Row Motorsports, and were on Michael McDowell's car when he finished in 1st place in the Daytona 500 in 2021. Front Row Motorsports opened a NASCAR Truck Series team in 2021 and Love's is a primary sponsor. Love's was on the Zane Smith's truck when he won the 2022 NextEra Energy 250.

In February 2023, Love's announced that it had purchased Lawton, Oklahoma-based EZ GO Stores, a chain of 22 convenience stores operating in three states (15 stores as well as a CNG fueling station in Oklahoma, five stores in Kansas and two stores in Nebraska). 

Company founder and executive chairman Tom Love died at his home in Oklahoma City, Oklahoma, on March 7, 2023, at age 85.

Key dates
1964: Tom and Judy Love launch the Musket chain with a gas station in Watonga, Oklahoma.
1972: The first Country Store opens in Guymon, Oklahoma.
1978: Love's Country Stores Inc. is established.
1981: The first Travel Stop opens in Amarillo, Texas.
1986: The company is renamed Love's Travel Stops & Country Stores, Inc.
1990: Love's adds major branded fast-food franchises to travel stops. 
1999: Love's opens its 50th travel stop. 
2000: Gemini Motor Transport becomes the primary carrier for Love's.  
2013: Love's opens 300th location.
2015: Love's opens 300th travel stop. 
2016: Love's purchases Trillium CNG. Love's opens 400th location. 
2017: Love's purchases Speedco. 
2019: Love's opens 500th location. 
2023: Love's purchases EZ GO Stores.

See also

References

External links

 

1964 establishments in Oklahoma
American companies established in 1964
Blaine County, Oklahoma
Companies based in Oklahoma City
Convenience stores of the United States
Gas stations in the United States
Oklahoma City Thunder
Privately held companies of the United States
Retail companies established in 1964
Truck stop chains
Family-owned companies of the United States